Phoenicia was an ancient thalassocratic civilization originating in the Levant region of the eastern Mediterranean, primarily located in modern Lebanon and coastal Syria. The territory of the Phoenicians extended and shrank throughout history, with the core of their culture stretching from Tripoli in northern Lebanon to Mount Carmel in modern Israel. Beyond their homeland, the Phoenicians extended throughout the Mediterranean, from Cyprus to the Iberian Peninsula.

The Phoenicians were a Semitic-speaking people of somewhat unknown origin who emerged in the Levant around 3000 BC. The term Phoenicia is an ancient Greek exonym that most likely described one of their most famous exports, a dye also known as Tyrian purple; it did not correspond precisely to a cohesive culture or society as it would have been understood natively. It is debated whether Phoenicians were actually distinct from the broader group of Semitic-speaking peoples known as Canaanites. Historian Robert Drews believes the term "Canaanites" corresponds to the ethnic group referred to as "Phoenicians" by the ancient Greeks; archaeologist Jonathan N. Tubb argues that "Ammonites, Moabites, Israelites, and Phoenicians undoubtedly achieved their own cultural identities, and yet ethnically they were all Canaanites", "the same people who settled in farming villages in the region in the 8th millennium BC."

The Phoenicians came to prominence in the mid-12th century BC, following the decline of most major cultures in the Late Bronze Age collapse. They were renowned among contemporaries as skilled traders and mariners, becoming the dominant commercial power for much of classical antiquity. The Phoenicians developed an expansive maritime trade network that lasted over a millennium, helping facilitate the exchange of cultures, ideas, and knowledge between major cradles of civilization such as Greece, Egypt, and Mesopotamia. After its zenith in the ninth century BC, the Phoenician civilization in the eastern Mediterranean slowly declined in the face of foreign influence and conquest; its presence endured in the central and western Mediterranean until the mid-second century BC.

The Phoenicians were organized in city-states, similar to those of ancient Greece, of which the most notable were Tyre, Sidon, and Byblos. Each city-state was politically independent, and there is no evidence the Phoenicians viewed themselves as a single nationality. The Phoenicians established colonies and trading posts across the Mediterranean; Carthage, a settlement in northwest Africa, became a major civilization in its own right in the seventh century BC. Phoenician society and cultural life centered on commerce and seafaring; while most city-states were governed by some form of kingship, merchant families likely exercised influence through oligarchies.

The Phoenicians were long considered a lost civilization due to the lack of indigenous written records, and only since the mid-20th century have historians and archaeologists been able to reveal a complex and influential civilization. Their best known legacy is the world's oldest verified alphabet, whose origin was connected to that of the Hebrew script via the Proto-Sinaitic script, and which was transmitted across the Mediterranean and used to develop the Arabic script and Greek alphabet and in turn the Latin and Cyrillic alphabets. The Phoenicians are also credited with innovations in shipbuilding, navigation, industry, agriculture, and government. Their international trade network is believed to have fostered the economic, political, and cultural foundations of Classical Western civilization.

Etymology
Being a society of independent city-states, the Phoenicians apparently did not have a term to denote the land of Phoenicia as a whole; instead, demonyms were often derived from the name of the city an individual hailed from (e.g., Sidonian for Sidon, Tyrian for Tyre, etc.) If the Phoenicians did possess an endonym to denote the land overall, some scholars believe that they would have used "Canaan" and therefore referred to themselves as "Canaanites". According to one reconstruction, the Honeyman inscription, dated to  900 BCE by William F. Albright, seems to contain a reference to the Phoenician homeland, calling it Pūt (Phoenician: 𐤐𐤕). Poenulus, a Latin comedic play  written in the early second century BCE, appears to preserve a Punic term for "Phoenicians" which may be reconstructed as *Pōnnīm.

The name Phoenicians, like Latin  (adj. , later ), comes from Greek . The word   (not to be confused with the mythical bird phoenix, which shares this spelling) meant variably "Phoenician person", "Tyrian purple, crimson" or "date palm." Homer used it with each of these meanings. It is difficult to ascertain which meaning came first, but it is understandable how Greeks may have associated the crimson or purple color of dates and dye with the merchants who traded both products. A derivative, po-ni-ki-jo, is already attested in Mycenaean Greek Linear B from the 2nd Millennium BC. In these records, it means "crimson" or "palm tree" and does not denote a group of people. Likewise, obelisks at Karnak describe Thutmose III smiting the prominent men of Retjenu (the region of Canaan and Syria) and a land belonging to what it calls the fnḫw, which is sometimes identified with Phoenicia, as it would represent a reasonable point of origin for the Linear B term po-ni-ki-jo, and seems to be the plural form of the Ancient Egyptian word for "carpenter", fnḫ, befitting of the crucial station Phoenicia served in the lumber trade of the Levant.

History

Since little has survived of Phoenician records or literature, most of what is known about their origins and history comes from the accounts of other civilizations and inferences from their material culture excavated throughout the Mediterranean. The scholarly consensus is that the Phoenicians' period of greatest prominence was 1200 BC to the end of the Persian period (332 BC).

The Phoenician Early Bronze Age is largely unknown. The two most important sites are Byblos and Sidon-Dakerman (near Sidon), although, as of 2021, well over a hundred sites remain to be excavated, while others that have been are yet to be fully analysed. The Middle Bronze Age was a generally peaceful time of increasing population, trade, and prosperity, though there was competition for natural resources. In the Late Bronze Age, rivalry between Egypt, the Mittani, the Hittites, and Assyria had a significant impact on Phoenicians cities.

Origins

The Canaanite culture that gave rise to the Phoenicians apparently developed in situ from the earlier Ghassulian chalcolithic culture. Ghassulian itself developed from the Circum-Arabian Nomadic Pastoral Complex, which in turn developed from a fusion of their ancestral Natufian and Harifian cultures with Pre-Pottery Neolithic B (PPNB) farming cultures, practicing the domestication of animals during the 8.2 kiloyear event, which led to the Neolithic Revolution in the Levant. The Late Bronze Age state of Ugarit is considered quintessentially Canaanite archaeologically, even though the Ugaritic language does not belong to the Canaanite languages proper.

The fourth-century BC Greek historian Herodotus claimed that the Phoenicians had migrated from the Erythraean Sea around 2750 BC and the first-century AD geographer Strabo reports a claim that they came from Tylos and Arad (Bahrain and Muharraq). Some archaeologists working on the Persian Gulf have accepted these traditions and suggest a migration connected with the collapse of the Dilmun civilization ca. 1750 BC. However, most scholars reject the idea of a migration; archaeological and historical evidence alike indicate millennia of population continuity in the region, and recent genetic research indicates that present-day Lebanese derive most of their ancestry from a Canaanite-related population.

Emergence during the Late Bronze Age (1479–1200 BC)
The first known account of the Phoenicians relates to the conquests of Pharaoh Thutmose III (1479–1425 BC). The Egyptians targeted coastal cities which they wrote belonged to the Fenekhu, "carpenters", such as Byblos, Arwad, and Ullasa for their crucial geographic and commercial links with the interior (via the Nahr al-Kabir and the Orontes rivers). The cities provided Egypt with access to Mesopotamian trade and abundant stocks of the region's native cedarwood. There was no equivalent in the Egyptian homeland.

By the mid-14th century BC, the Phoenician city-states were considered "favored cities" to the Egyptians. Tyre, Sidon, Beirut, and Byblos were regarded as the most important. The Phoenicians had considerable autonomy, and their cities were reasonably well developed and prosperous. Byblos was the leading city; it was a center for bronze-making and the primary terminus of precious goods such as tin and lapis lazuli from as far east as Afghanistan. Sidon and Tyre also commanded interest among Egyptian officials, beginning a pattern of rivalry that would span the next millennium.

The Amarna letters report that from 1350 to 1300 BC, neighboring Amorites and Hittites were capturing Phoenician cities, especially in the north. Egypt subsequently lost its coastal holdings from Ugarit in northern Syria to Byblos near central Lebanon.

Ascendance and high point (1200–800 BC)
Sometime between 1200 and 1150 BC, the Late Bronze Age collapse severely weakened or destroyed most civilizations in the region, including the Egyptians and Hittites. The Phoenicians appear to have weathered the crisis relatively well, emerging as a distinct and organized civilization in 1230 BC. The period is sometimes described as a "Phoenician renaissance." They filled the power vacuum caused by the Late Bronze Age collapse by becoming the sole mercantile and maritime power in the region, a status they would maintain for the next several centuries.

The recovery of the Mediterranean economy can be credited to Phoenician mariners and merchants, who re-established long-distance trade between Egypt and Mesopotamia in the 10th century BC.

Early into the Iron Age, the Phoenicians established ports, warehouses, markets, and settlement all across the Mediterranean and up to the southern Black Sea. Colonies were established on Cyprus, Sardinia, the Balearic Islands, Sicily, and Malta, as well as the coasts of North Africa and the Iberian Peninsula. Phoenician hacksilver dated to this period bears lead isotope ratios matching ores in Sardinia and Spain, indicating the extent of Phoenician trade networks.

By the tenth century BC, Tyre rose to become the richest and most powerful Phoenician city-state, particularly during the reign of Hiram I (c. 969–936 BC). During the rule of the priest Ithobaal (887–856  BC), Tyre expanded its territory as far north as Beirut and into part of Cyprus; this unusual act of aggression was the closest the Phoenicians ever came to forming a unitary territorial state. Once his realm reached its largest territorial extent, Ithobaal declared himself "King of the Sidonians," a title that would be used by his successors and mentioned in both Greek and Jewish accounts.

The Late Iron Age saw the height of Phoenician shipping, mercantile, and cultural activity, particularly between 750 and 650 BC. The Phoenician influence was visible in the "orientalization" of Greek cultural and artistic conventions. Among their most popular goods were fine textiles, typically dyed with Tyrian purple. Homer's Iliad, which was composed during this period, references the quality of Phoenician clothing and metal goods.

Foundation of Carthage

Carthage was founded by Phoenicians coming from Tyre, probably initially as a station in the metal trade with the southern Iberian Peninsula. The city's name in Punic, means "New City". There is a tradition in some ancient sources, such as Philistos of Syracuse, for an "early" foundation date of around 1215 BC—before the fall of Troy in 1180 BC. However, Timaeus, a Greek historian from Sicily c. 300 BC, places the foundation of Carthage in 814 BC, which is the date generally accepted by modern historians. Legend, including Virgil's Aeneid, assigns the founding of the city to Queen Dido. Carthage would grow into a multi-ethnic empire spanning North Africa, Sardinia, Sicily, Malta, the Balearic Islands, and southern Iberia, but would ultimately be destroyed by Rome in the Punic Wars (264–146 BC) before being rebuilt as a Roman city.

Vassalage under the Assyrians and Babylonians (858–538 BC)

As a mercantile power concentrated along a narrow coastal strip of land, the Phoenicians lacked the size and population to support a large military. Thus, as neighboring empires began to rise, the Phoenicians increasingly fell under the sway of foreign rulers, who to varying degrees circumscribed their autonomy.

The Assyrian conquest of Phoenicia began with King Shalmaneser III. He rose to power in 858 BC and began a series of campaigns against neighboring states. The Phoenician city-states fell under his rule, forced to pay heavy tribute in money, goods, and natural resources. Initially, they were not annexed outright—they remained in a state of vassalage, subordinate to the Assyrians but allowed a certain degree of freedom. This changed in 744 BC with the ascension of Tiglath-Pileser III. By 738 BC, most of the Levant, including northern Phoenicia, were annexed; only Tyre and Byblos, the most powerful city-states, remained tributary states outside of direct Assyrian control.

Tyre, Byblos, and Sidon all rebelled against Assyrian rule. In 721 BC, Sargon II besieged Tyre and crushed the rebellion. His successor Sennacherib suppressed further rebellions across the region. During the seventh century BC, Sidon rebelled and was destroyed by Esarhaddon, who enslaved its inhabitants and built a new city on its ruins. By the end of the century, the Assyrians had been weakened by successive revolts, which led to their destruction by the Median Empire.

The Babylonians, formerly vassals of the Assyrians, took advantage of the empire's collapse and rebelled, quickly establishing the Neo-Babylonian Empire in its place. Phoenician cities revolted several times throughout the reigns of the first Babylonian King, Nabopolassar (626–605 BC), and his son Nebuchadnezzar II (c. 605–c. 562 BC). In 587 BC Nebuchadnezzar besieged Tyre, which resisted for thirteen years, but ultimately capitulated under "favorable terms".

Persian period (539–332 BC)

In 539 BC, Cyrus the Great, king and founder of the Persian Achaemenid Empire, took Babylon. As Cyrus began consolidating territories across the Near East, the Phoenicians apparently made the pragmatic calculation of "[yielding] themselves to the Persians." Most of the Levant was consolidated by Cyrus into a single satrapy (province) and forced to pay a yearly tribute of 350 talents, which was roughly half the tribute that was required of Egypt and Libya.

The Phoenician area was later divided into four vassal kingdoms—Sidon, Tyre, Arwad, and Byblos—which were allowed considerable autonomy. Unlike in other empire areas, there is no record of Persian administrators governing the Phoenician city-states. Local Phoenician kings were allowed to remain in power and given the same rights as Persian satraps (governors), such as hereditary offices and minting their coins.

The Phoenicians remained a core asset to the Achaemenid Empire, particularly for their prowess in maritime technology and navigation; they furnished the bulk of the Persian fleet during the Greco-Persian Wars of the late fifth century BC. Phoenicians under Xerxes I built the Xerxes Canal and the pontoon bridges that allowed his forces to cross into mainland Greece. Nevertheless, they were harshly punished by the Persian King following his defeat at the Battle of Salamis, which he blamed on Phoenician cowardice and incompetence.

In the mid-fourth century BC, King Tennes of Sidon led a failed rebellion against Artaxerxes III, enlisting the help of the Egyptians, who were subsequently drawn into a war with the Persians. The resulting destruction of Sidon led to the resurgence of Tyre, which remained the dominant Phoenician city for two decades until the arrival of Alexander the Great.

Hellenistic period (332–152 BC)
Phoenicia was one of the first areas to be conquered by Alexander the Great during his military campaigns across western Asia. Alexander's main target in the Persian Levant was Tyre, now the region's largest and most important city. It capitulated after a roughly seven month siege, during which many of its citizens fled to Carthage. Tyre's refusal to allow Alexander to visit its temple to Melqart, culminating in the killing of his envoys, led to a brutal reprisal: 2,000 of its leading citizens were crucified and a puppet ruler was installed. The rest of Phoenicia easily came under his control, with Sidon surrendering peacefully.

Alexander's empire had a Hellenization policy, whereby Hellenic culture, religion, and sometimes language were spread or imposed across conquered peoples. However, Hellenisation was not enforced most of the time and was just a language of administration until his death. This was typically implemented through the founding of new cities, the settlement of a Macedonian or Greek urban elite, and the alteration of native place names to Greek. However, there was no organized Hellenization in Phoenicia, and with one or two minor exceptions, all Phoenician city-states retained their native names, while Greek settlement and administration appear to have been very limited.

The Phoenicians maintained cultural and commercial links with their western counterparts. Polybius recounts how the Seleucid King Demetrius I escaped from Rome by boarding a Carthaginian ship that was delivering goods to Tyre. The adaptation to Macedonian rule was likely aided by the Phoenicians' historical ties with the Greeks, with whom they shared some mythological stories and figures; the two peoples were even sometimes considered "relatives."

When Alexander's empire collapsed after his death in 323 BC, the Phoenicians came under the control of the largest of its successors, the Seleucids. The Phoenician homeland was repeatedly contested by the Ptolemaic Kingdom of Egypt during the forty-year Syrian Wars, coming under Ptolemaic rule in the third century BC. The Seleucids reclaimed the area the following century, holding it until the mid-first 2nd century BC. Under their rule, the Phoenicians were allowed a considerable degree of autonomy and self-governance.

During the Seleucid Dynastic Wars (157–63 BC), the Phoenician cities were mainly self-governed. Many of them were fought for or over by the warring factions of the Seleucid royal family. Some Phoenician regions were under the control and influence of the Jews, who revolted and succeeded in defeating Seleucids in 164 BC.

The Seleucid Kingdom, including Phoenicia, was seized by Tigranes the Great of Armenia in 82 BC, ending the Hellenistic influence on the region.

With their strategically valuable buffer state absorbed into a rival power, the Romans intervened and conquered the territory in 62 BC. Shortly after that, the territory was incorporated into the Roman province of Syria. Phoenicia became a separate province in the third century AD. With the Roman invasion, whatever political autonomy Phoenicians had was dissolved, and the region was romanized. The Roman Empire ruled the province up to the 640s when the Muslim Arabs invaded the region successfully, and a process of Islamisation and Arabisation started.

Demographics
The people now known as Phoenicians, similar to the neighboring Israelites, Moabites and Edomites, were a Canaanite people. Canaanites are a group of ancient Semitic-speaking peoples that emerged in the Levant in at least the third millennium BC. Phoenicians did not refer themselves as such but rather are thought to have referred to themselves as "Kenaʿani", meaning Canaanites.

One 2018 study of mitochondrial lineages in Sardinia concluded that the Phoenicians were "inclusive, multicultural and featured significant female mobility," with evidence of indigenous Sardinians integrating "peacefully and permanently" with Semitic Phoenician settlers. The study also found evidence suggesting that south Europeans may have settled in the area of modern Lebanon.

Genetic studies

A 2008 study led by Pierre Zalloua found that six subclades of Haplogroup J-M172 (J2)—thought to have originated between the Caucasus Mountains, Mesopotamia and the Levant—were of a "Phoenician signature" and present amongst the male populations of coastal Lebanon as well as the wider Levant (the "Phoenician Periphery"), followed by other areas of historic Phoenician settlement, spanning Cyprus through to Morocco. This deliberate sequential sampling was an attempt to develop a methodology to link the documented historical expansion of a population with a particular geographic genetic pattern or patterns. The researchers suggested that the proposed genetic signature stemmed from "a common source of related lineages rooted in Lebanon". Another study in 2006 found evidence for the genetic persistence of Phoenicians in the Spanish island of Ibiza.

In 2016, the rare U5b2c1 maternal haplogroup was identified in the DNA of a 2,500-year-old male skeleton excavated from a Punic tomb in Tunisia. The lineage of this "Young Man of Byrsa" is believed to represent early gene flow from Iberia to the Maghreb.

According to a 2017 study published by the American Journal of Human Genetics, present-day Lebanese derive most of their ancestry from a Canaanite-related population, which therefore implies substantial genetic continuity in the Levant since at least the Bronze Age. More specifically, the research of geneticist Chris Tyler-Smith and his team at the Sanger Institute in Britain, who compared "sampled ancient DNA from five Canaanite people who lived 3,750 and 3,650 years ago" to modern people, revealed that 93 percent of the genetic ancestry of people in Lebanon came from the Canaanites (the other 7 percent was of a Eurasian steppe population).

In a 2020 study published in the American Journal of Human Genetics, researchers have shown that there is substantial genetic continuity in Lebanon since the Bronze Age interrupted by three significant admixture events during the Iron Age, Hellenistic, and Ottoman period, each contributing 3–11 percent of non-local ancestry to the admixed population.

Economy

Trade

The Phoenicians served as intermediaries between the disparate civilizations that spanned the Mediterranean and Near East, facilitating the exchange of goods and knowledge, culture, and religious traditions. Their expansive and enduring trade network is credited with laying the foundations of an economically and culturally cohesive Mediterranean, which would be continued by the Greeks and especially the Romans.

Phoenician ties with the Greeks ran deep. The earliest verified relationship appears to have begun with the Minoan civilization on Crete (1950–1450 BC), which together with the Mycenaean civilization (1600–1100 BC) is considered the progenitor of classical Greece. Archaeological research suggests that the Minoans gradually imported Near Eastern goods, artistic styles, and customs from other cultures via the Phoenicians.

To Egypt the Phoenicians sold logs of cedar for significant sums, and wine beginning in the eighth century. Pottery kilns at Tyre and Sarepta produced the large terracotta jars used for transporting wine. From Egypt, the Phoenicians bought Nubian gold.

From elsewhere, they obtained other materials, perhaps the most crucial being silver, mostly from Sardinia and the Iberian Peninsula. Tin for making bronze "may have been acquired from Galicia by way of the Atlantic coast of southern Spain; alternatively, it may have come from northern Europe (Cornwall or Brittany) via the Rhone valley and coastal Massalia."  Strabo states that there was a highly lucrative Phoenician trade with Britain for tin via the Cassiterides, whose location is unknown but may have been off the northwest coast of the Iberian Peninsula.

Industry

Phoenicia lacked considerable natural resources other than its cedar wood. Timber was probably the earliest and most lucrative source of wealth; neither Egypt nor Mesopotamia had adequate wood sources. Unable to rely solely on this limited resource, the Phoenicians developed an industrial base manufacturing a variety of goods for both everyday and luxury use. The Phoenicians developed or mastered techniques such as glass-making, engraved and chased metalwork (including bronze, iron, and gold), ivory carving, and woodwork.

The Phoenicians were early pioneers in mass production, and sold a variety of items in bulk. They became the leading source of glassware in antiquity, shipping thousands of flasks, beads, and other glass objects across the Mediterranean. Excavations of colonies in Spain suggest they also used the potter's wheel. Their exposure to a wide variety of cultures allowed them to manufacture goods for specific markets. The Iliad suggests Phoenician clothing and metal goods were highly prized by the Greeks. Specialized goods were designed specifically for wealthier clientele, including ivory reliefs and plaques, carved clam shells, sculpted amber, and finely detailed and painted ostrich eggs.

Tyrian purple

The most prized Phoenician goods were fabrics dyed with Tyrian purple, which formed a major part of Phoenician wealth. The violet-purple dye derived from the hypobranchial gland of the Murex marine snail, once profusely available in coastal waters of the eastern Mediterranean Sea but exploited to local extinction. Phoenicians may have discovered the dye as early as 1750 BC. The Phoenicians established a second production center for the dye in Mogador, in present-day Morocco.

The Phoenicians' exclusive command over the production and trade of the dye, combined with the labor-intensive extraction process, made it very expensive. Tyrian purple subsequently became associated with the upper classes. It soon became a status symbol in several civilizations, most notably among the Romans. Assyrian tribute records from the Phoenicians include "garments of brightly colored stuff" that most likely included Tyrian purple. While the designs, ornamentation, and embroidery used in Phoenician textiles were well-regarded, the techniques and specific descriptions are unknown.

Mining
Mining operations in the Phoenician homeland were limited; iron was the only metal of any worth. The first large-scale mining operations probably occurred in Cyprus, principally for copper. Sardinia may have been colonized almost exclusively for its mineral resources; Phoenician settlements were concentrated in the southern parts of the island, close to sources of copper and lead. Piles of scoria and copper ingots, which appear to predate Roman occupation, suggest the Phoenicians mined and processed metals on the island. The Iberian Peninsula was the richest source of numerous metals in antiquity, including gold, silver, copper, iron, tin, and lead. The significant output of these metals during the Phoenician and Carthaginian occupation strongly implied large scale mining operations. The Carthaginians are documented to have relied on slave labor for mining, though it is unknown if the Phoenicians as a whole did so.

Viticulture
The most notable agricultural product was wine, which the Phoenicians helped propagate across the Mediterranean. The common grape vine may have been domesticated by the Phoenicians or Canaanites, although it most likely arrived from Transcaucasia via trade routes across Mesopotamia or the Black Sea. Vines grew readily in the coastal Levant, and wine was exported to Egypt as early as the Old Kingdom period (2686–2134 BC). Wine played an important part in Phoenician religion, serving as the principal beverage for offerings and sacrifice. An excavation of a small Phoenician town south of Sidon uncovered a wine factory used from at least the seventh century BC, which is believed to have been aimed for an overseas market. To prevent oxidation, vessels were sealed with a layer of olive oil, pinewood, and resin.

The Phoenicians established vineyards and wineries in their colonies in North Africa, Sicily, France, and Spain, and may have taught winemaking to some of their trading partners. The ancient Iberians began producing wine from local grape varieties following their encounter with the Phoenicians. Iberian cultivars subsequently formed the basis of most western European wine.

Shipbuilding

As early as 1200 BC, the Phoenicians built large merchant ships. During the Bronze Age, they developed the keel. Pegged mortise-and-tenon joints proved effective enough to serve as a standard until late into the Roman Empire.

The Phoenicians were possibly the first to introduce the bireme, around 700 BC. An Assyrian account describes Phoenicians evading capture with these ships. The Phoenicians are also credited with inventing the trireme, which was regarded as the most advanced and powerful vessel in the ancient Mediterranean world, and was eventually adopted by the Greeks.

The Phoenicians developed several other maritime inventions. The amphora, a type of container used for both dry and liquid goods, was an ancient Phoenician invention that became a standardized measurement of volume for close to two thousand years. The remnants of self-cleaning artificial harbors have been discovered in Sidon, Tyre, Atlit, and Acre. The first example of admiralty law also appears in the Levant. The Phoenicians continued to contribute to cartography into the Iron Age.

Dated 700 BC, it is one of the oldest wrecks found in the Mediterranean. Fifty amphorae, used to contain wine and oil, were scattered nearby.

Important cities and colonies

The Phoenicians were not a nation in the political sense. However, they were organized into independent city-states that shared a common language and culture. The leading city-states were Tyre, Sidon, and Byblos. Rivalries were expected, but armed conflict was rare.

Numerous other cities existed in the Levant alone, many probably unknown, including Beiruta (modern Beirut) Ampi, Amia, Arqa, Baalbek, Botrys, Sarepta, and Tripolis. From the late tenth century BC, the Phoenicians established commercial outposts throughout the Mediterranean, with Tyre founding colonies in Cyprus, Sardinia, Iberia, the Balearic Islands, Sicily, Malta, and North Africa. Later colonies were established beyond the Straits of Gibraltar, particularly on the Atlantic coast of Iberia. The Phoenicians may have explored the Canary Islands and the British Isles. Phoenician settlement was primarily concentrated in Cyprus, Sicily, Sardinia, Malta, northwest Africa, the Balearic Islands, and southern Iberia.

Phoenician colonization
To facilitate their commercial ventures, the Phoenicians established numerous colonies and trading posts along the coasts of the Mediterranean. Phoenician city states generally lacked the numbers or even the desire to expand their territory overseas. Few colonies had more than 1,000 inhabitants; only Carthage and some nearby settlements in the western Mediterranean would grow larger. A major motivating factor was competition with the Greeks, who began expanding across the Mediterranean during the same period. Though largely peaceful rivals, their respective settlements in Crete and Sicily did clash intermittently.

The earliest Phoenician settlements outside the Levant were on Cyprus and Crete, gradually moving westward towards Corsica, the Balearic Islands, Sardinia, and Sicily, as well as on the European mainland in Genoa and Marseilles. The first Phoenician colonies in the western Mediterranean were along the northwest African coast and on Sicily, Sardinia and the Balearic Islands. Tyre led the way in settling or controlling coastal areas.

Phoenician colonies were fairly autonomous. At most, they were expected to send annual tribute to their mother city, usually in the context of a religious offering. However, in the seventh century BC the western colonies came under the control of Carthage, which was exercised directly through appointed magistrates. Carthage continued to send annual tribute to Tyre for some time after its independence.

Society and culture

Since very little of the Phoenicians' writings have survived, much of what is known about their culture and society comes from accounts by contemporary civilizations or inferences from archaeological discoveries. The Phoenicians had much in common with other Canaanites, including language, religion, social customs, and a monarchical political system centered around city-states. However, by the early Iron Age (roughly 1300 BC), they had emerged as distinct people. Their culture, economy, and daily life were heavily centered on commerce and maritime trade. Their propensity for seafaring brought them into contact with numerous other civilizations.

Politics and government

The Phoenician city-states were fiercely independent in both domestic and foreign affairs. Formal alliances between city-states were rare. The relative power and influence of city-states varied over time. Sidon was dominant between the 12th and 11th centuries BC and influenced its neighbors. However, by the tenth century BC, Tyre rose to become the most powerful city.

At least in its earlier stages, Phoenician society was highly stratified and predominantly monarchical. Hereditary kings usually governed with absolute power over civic, commercial, and religious affairs. They often relied upon senior officials from the noble and merchant classes; the priesthood was a distinct class, usually of royal lineage or leading merchant families. The King was considered a representative of the gods and carried many obligations and duties concerning religious processions and rituals. Priests were thus highly influential and often became intertwined with the royal family.

Phoenician kings did not commemorate their reign through sculptures or monuments. Their wealth, power, and accomplishments were usually conveyed through ornate sarcophagi, like that of Ahiram of Byblos. The Phoenicians kept records of their rulers in tomb inscriptions, which are among the few primary sources still available. Historians have determined a clear line of succession over centuries for some city-states, notably Byblos and Tyre.

Starting as early as 15th century BC, Phoenician leaders were "advised by councils or assemblies which gradually took greater power".

In the fourth century BC, when the armies of Alexander the Great approached Tyre, they were met not by its King but by representatives of the commonwealth of the city. Similarly, historians at the time describe the "inhabitants" or "the people" of Sidon making peace with Alexander. When the Macedonians sought to appoint a new king over Sidon, the citizens nominated their candidate.

Law and administration
After the King and council, the two most important political positions in virtually every Phoenician city-state were governor and commander of the army. Details regarding the duties of these offices are sparse. However, it is known that the governor was responsible for collecting taxes, implementing decrees, supervising judges, and ensuring the administration of law and justice. As warfare was rare among the most mercantile Phoenicians, the army's commander was generally responsible for ensuring the defense and security of the city-state and its hinterlands.

The Phoenicians had a system of courts and judges that resolved disputes and punished crimes based on a semi-codified body of laws and traditions. Laws were implemented by the state and were the responsibility of the ruler and certain designated officials. Like other Levantine societies, laws were harsh and biased, reflecting the social stratification of society. The murder of a commoner was treated as less severe than that of a nobleman, and the upper classes had the most rights; the wealthy often escaped punishment by paying a fine. Free men of any class could represent themselves in court and had more rights than women and children, while slaves had no rights. Men could often deflect punishment to their wives, children, or slaves, even having them serve their sentence in their place. Lawyers eventually emerged as a profession for those who could not plead their case.

As in neighboring societies at the time, penalties for crimes were often severe, usually reflecting the principle of reciprocity; for example, the killing of a slave would be punished by having the offender's slave killed. Imprisonment was rare, with fines, exile, punishment, and execution the main remedies.

Military
As with most aspects of Phoenician civilization, there are few records of their military or approach to warfare. Compared to most of their neighbors, the Phoenicians generally had little interest in conquest and were relatively peaceful. The wealth and prosperity of all their city-states rested on foreign trade, which required good relations and a certain degree of mutual trust. They also lacked the territory and agricultural base to support a population large enough to raise an army of conquest. Instead, each city had an army commander in charge of a defensive garrison. However, the specifics of the role, or city defense, are unknown.

Language

The Phoenician language was a member of the Canaanite branch of the Northwest Semitic languages. Its descendant language spoken in the Carthaginian Empire is termed Punic. Punic was still spoken in the fifth century AD and known to St. Augustine of Hippo.

Alphabet

Around 1050 BC, the Phoenicians developed a script for writing their own language. The Canaanite-Phoenician alphabet consists of 22 letters, all consonants (and is thus strictly an abjad). It is believed to be a continuation of the Proto-Sinaitic (or Proto-Canaanite) script attested in the Sinai and in Canaan in the Late Bronze Age. Through their maritime trade, the Phoenicians spread the use of the alphabet to Anatolia, North Africa, and Europe. The name Phoenician is by convention given to inscriptions beginning around 1050 BC, because Phoenician, Hebrew, and other Canaanite dialects were largely indistinguishable before that time. Phoenician inscriptions are found in Lebanon, Syria, Israel, Palestine, Cyprus and other locations, as late as the early centuries of the Christian era.

The alphabet was adopted and modified by the Greeks probably in the eighth century BC. This most likely did not occur in a single instance but the process of commercial exchange. The legendary Phoenician hero Cadmus is credited with bringing the alphabet to Greece. However, it is more plausible that Phoenician immigrants brought it to Crete, whence it gradually diffused northwards.

Art

Phoenician art was largely centered on ornamental objects, particularly jewelry, pottery, glassware, and reliefs. Large sculptures were rare; figurines were more common. Phoenician goods have been found from Spain and Morocco to Russia and Iraq; much of what is known about Phoenician art is based on excavations outside Phoenicia proper. Phoenician art was highly influenced by many cultures, primarily Egypt, Greece, and Assyria. Greek inspiration was particularly pronounced in pottery, while Egyptian styles were most reflected in ivory work.

Phoenician art also differed from its contemporaries in its continuance of Bronze Age conventions well into the Iron Age, such as terracotta masks. Phoenician artisans were known for their skill with wood, ivory, bronze, and textiles. In the Old Testament, a craftsman from Tyre is commissioned to build and decorate the legendary Solomon's Temple in Jerusalem, which "presupposes a well-developed and highly respected craft industry in Phoenicia by the mid-tenth century BC". The Iliad mentions the embroidered robes of Priam’s wife, Hecabe, as "the work of Sidonian women" and describes a mixing bowl of chased silver as "a masterpiece of Sidonian craftsmanship." The Assyrians appeared to have valued Phoenician ivory work in particular, collecting vast quantities in their palaces.

Phoenician art appears to have been indelibly tied to Phoenician commercial interests. They have crafted goods to appeal to particular trading partners, distinguishing not only different cultures but even socioeconomic status classes.

Women

Women in Phoenicia took part in public events and religious processions, with depictions of banquets showing them casually sitting or reclining with men, dancing, and playing music. In most contexts, women were expected to dress and behave more modestly than men; female figures are almost always portrayed as clothed from head to feet, with the arms sometimes covered as well.

Although they rarely had political power, women took part in community affairs. They had some voice in the popular assemblies that began to emerge in some city-states. At least one woman, Unmiashtart, is recorded to have ruled Sidon in the fifth century BC. The two most famous Phoenician women are political figures: Jezebel, portrayed in the Bible as the wicked princess of Sidon, and Dido, the semi-legendary founder and first queen of Carthage. In Virgil's epic poem, the Aeneid, Dido is described as having been the co-ruler of Tyre, using cleverness to escape the tyranny of her brother Pygmalion and to secure an ideal site for Carthage.

Religion

The religious practices and beliefs of Phoenicia were generally common to those of their neighbors in Canaan, which in turn shared characteristics common throughout the ancient Semitic world. Religious rites were primarily for city-state purposes; payment of taxes by citizens was considered in the category of religious sacrifices. The Phoenician sacred writings known to the ancients have been lost.

Several Canaanite practices are attested in ancient sources and mentioned by scholars, such as temple prostitution and child sacrifice. Special sites known as "Tophets" were allegedly used by the Phoenicians "to burn their sons and their daughters in the fire," and are condemned by Yahweh in the Hebrew Bible, particularly in Jeremiah 7:30–32, and in 2nd Kings 23:10 and 17:17. Notwithstanding these and other important differences, cultural and religious similarities persisted between the ancient Hebrews and the Phoenicians. 

Canaanite religious mythology does not appear as elaborate as their Semitic cousins in Mesopotamia. In Canaan the supreme god was called El (𐤀𐤋, "god"). The son of El was Baal (𐤁𐤏𐤋, "master", "lord"), a powerful dying-and-rising storm god. Other gods were called by royal titles, such as Melqart, meaning "king of the city", or Adonis for "lord". Such epithets may often have been merely local titles for the same deities.

The Semitic pantheon was well-populated; which god became primary evidently depended on the exigencies of a particular city-state. Melqart was prominent throughout Phoenicia and overseas, as was Astarte, a fertility goddess with regal and matronly aspects.

Religious institutions in Tyre called  (𐤌𐤓𐤆𐤄, "place of reunion"), did much to foster social bonding and "kin" loyalty.  held banquets for their membership on festival days, and many developed into elite fraternities. Each  nurtured congeniality and community through a series of ritual meals shared among trusted kin in honor of deified ancestors. In Carthage, which had developed a complex republican system of government, the  may have played a role in forging social and political ties among citizens; Carthaginians were divided into different institutions that were solidified through communal feasts and banquets. Such festival groups may also have composed the voting cohort for selecting members of the city-state's Assembly.

The Phoenicians made votive offerings to their gods, namely in the form of figurines and pottery vessels. Hundreds of figurines and fragments have been recovered from the Mediterranean, often spanning centuries between them, suggesting they were cast into the sea to ensure safe travels. Since the Phoenicians were predominantly seafaring people, it is speculated that many of their rituals were performed at sea or aboard ships. However, the specific nature of these practices is unknown.

See also
 Canaan
 Maronites
 Names of the Levant
 Phoenicianism
 Punic language
 Punics
 Theory of Phoenician discovery of the Americas
 Phoenician-Punic literature

References

Citations

Sources

  See Review by Roger Wright, University of Liverpool.
 Bondi, S. F. 1988. "The Course of History." In The Phoenicians, edited by Sabatino Moscati, 38–45. Milan: Gruppo Editoriale Fabbri.
 
 
 
 
 
 Elayi, J. 2013. . Paris: Perrin
 
 
 
 
 
 
 
 
 
 W. Röllig (1995), Phoenician and the Phoenicians in the context of the Ancient Near East, in S. Moscati (ed.), I Fenici ieri oggi domani : ricerche, scoperte, progetti, Roma, p. 203-214

Further reading
 Carayon, Nicolas, Les ports phéniciens et puniques, PhD Thesis, 2008, Strasbourg, France.
 Cerqueiro, Daniel, Buenos Aires, Ed. Peq. Venecia, 2002, .
 Cioffi, Robert L., "A Palm Tree, a Colour and a Mythical Bird" (review of Josephine Quinn, In Search of the Phoenicians, Princeton, 2017, 360 pp.), London Review of Books, vol. 41, no. 1 (3 January 2019), pp. 15–16.
 Thiollet, Jean-Pierre, foreword by Guy Gay-Para, H & D, Paris, 2005, .
 , for a critical examination of the evidence of Phoenician trade with the South West of the U.K.
 Silva, Diógenes. "La literatura sobre fenicios en el territorio brasileño: orígenes y razones", PhD Thesis, Madrid - 2016. Available in https://eprints.ucm.es/39468/

External links

 BBC Radio4 – In Our Time: The Phoenicians (audio archive)
 The quest for the Phoenicians in South Lebanon
 Phoenician Alphabet
 

 
Ancient Lebanon
Ancient Levant
Ancient Near East
Bronze Age Asia
Bronze Age cultures
Iron Age cultures of Asia
Iron Age cultures of Africa
History of the Mediterranean
Ancient Asia
Ancient Africa
Ancient Europe
Ancient Syria
Ancient history of Turkey
Ancient history of the Iberian Peninsula
Ancient history of North Africa
History of Palestine (region)
History of Western Asia
Axial Age civilizations
2nd millennium BC
9th century BC
8th century BC
7th century BC
6th century BC
States and territories established in the 3rd millennium BC
States and territories disestablished in the 6th century BC
6th-century BC disestablishments
Ancient Israel and Judah